One athlete from India competed at the 1900 Summer Olympics in Paris, France, thereby being the nation's first appearance at the modern Olympic Games.  Olympic historians tend to separate Indian results from British ones despite India's lack of independence, in a similar manner to the separation of results of competitors from Australia before 1901.  One athlete, Norman Pritchard, represented India in 1900.

In 2005, the IAAF published the official track and field statistics for the 2004 Summer Olympics. In the historical records section Pritchard was listed as having competed for Great Britain in 1900. Research by Olympic historians has shown that Pritchard was chosen to represent Great Britain after competing in the British AAA championship in June 1900. 
The IOC still regard Pritchard as having competed for India.

Pritchard competed in athletics, entering five events and taking second place in two of them. Until 2020 when Neeraj Chopra won the gold medal in the men's javelin throw, Pritchard was the sole Olympic athletics medallist to be officially recorded as having represented India.

At the end of the games, India ranked 19th, having won two silver medals. This was the first participation of an Asian country in the Olympic Games.

Medalists

Results by event

Athletics

References

External links
Times article - March 19 2005 "India defiant over Olympic medals"

Nations at the 1900 Summer Olympics
1900
Olympics